Baluev or Baluyev (from баловать meaning to pumper) is a Russian masculine surname, its feminine counterpart is Balueva or Baluyeva. It may refer to
Aleksandr Baluev (born 1958), Russian actor
Pyotr Baluyev (1857–1923), general in the Imperial Russian Army

See also
Meet Baluyev!, a 1963 Soviet drama film

Russian-language surnames